Caudoviricetes is an class of viruses known as the tailed bacteriophages (cauda is Latin for "tail"). Under the Baltimore classification scheme, the Caudoviricetes are group I viruses as they have double stranded DNA (dsDNA) genomes, which can be anywhere from 18,000 base pairs to 500,000 base pairs in length. The virus particles have a distinct shape; each virion has an icosahedral head that contains the viral genome, and is attached to a flexible tail by a connector protein. The order encompasses a wide range of viruses, many containing genes of similar nucleotide sequence and function. However, some tailed bacteriophage genomes can vary quite significantly in nucleotide sequence, even among the same genus. Due to their characteristic structure and possession of potentially homologous genes, it is believed these bacteriophages possess a common origin.

There are 4 orders, 47 families, 98 subfamilies, 1197 genera, 3601 species in the class. This makes Caudoviricetes the most populous class among viruses, accounting for approximately 30% of all recognized virus species and nearly half of all virus genera.

Infection 
Upon encountering a host bacterium, the tail section of the virion binds to receptors on the cell surface and delivers the DNA into the cell by use of an injectisome-like mechanism (an injectisome is a nanomachine that evolved for the delivery of proteins by type III secretion). The tail section of the virus punches a hole through the bacterial cell wall and plasma membrane and the genome passes down the tail into the cell. Once inside the genes are expressed from transcripts made by the host machinery, using host ribosomes. Typically, the genome is replicated by use of concatemers, in which overlapping segments of DNA are made, and then put together to form the whole genome.

Assembly and maturation 
Viral capsid proteins come together to form a precursor prohead, into which the genome enters. Once this has occurred, the prohead undergoes maturation by cleavage of capsid subunits to form an icosahedral phage head with 5-fold symmetry. After the head maturation, the tail is joined in one of two ways: Either the tail is constructed separately, and joined with the connector, or the tail is constructed directly onto the phage head. The tails consist of helix based proteins with 6-fold symmetry. After maturation of virus particles, the cell is lysed by lysins, holins, or a combination of the two.

Basis for Taxonomy 

For most of virological history, Caudoviricetes which was known as the order Caudovirales, had lower taxa defined via morphology and contractile ability of their "tails".  The Myoviridae had long tails that were contractile; the Podoviridae had short noncontractile tails; and the Siphoviridae had long noncontractile tails. Siphoviridae constitute the majority of the known tailed viruses.

Bradley referred to what was known as the Myoviridae as type A, Siphoviridae as type B, and the Podoviridae as type C. He also divided his groups on the basis of head morphology: Within group A, A1 have small isometric heads; A2 have prolate heads; and A3 have elongated heads. Within groups B and C, numbers were similarly assigned: B1 and C1 have small isometric heads; B2 and C2 have prolate heads; and B3 and C3 have elongated heads.

Because the "families" Myoviridae, Podoviridae and Siphoviridae were abolished for being polyphyletic, there are now many free-floating families, subfamilies, and genera in the class without any preceding taxa before Caudoviricetes. There are currently 4 orders, 47 families, 98 subfamilies, 1197 genera, 3601 species in the class. This article lists all official and proposed taxa of Caudoviricetes. (Note: Quotes means that the taxon is proposed and has not yet been ratified by the ICTV.)

Immediately Succeeding Orders 
 Crassvirales
 Kirjokansivirales
 Thumleimavirales
 Methanobavirales
 "Nakonvirales"
 "Magrovirales"

Etymology 

Crassvirales infects bacteria and is named after the computer program crAss, which was used to identify the first member of the Crassvirales order.

The rest (including the proposed orders) infect archaea.  Kirjokansivirales, Thumleimavirales, and "Nakonvirales" are named after mythological objects or deities; Methanobavirales and "Magrovirales" are named after archaic synonyms of the archaea they infect.

Unassigned families 

Ackermannviridae
"Aliceevansviridae" (proposed to group Brussowvirus and Moineauvirus)
"Arenbergviridae"
Autographiviridae
Aggregaviridae
Assiduviridae
Casjensviridae
Chaseviridae
Demerecviridae
Drexlerviridae
Duneviridae
Forsetiviridae
"Grimontviridae" (proposed to group Privateervirus)
Guelinviridae
Helgolandviridae
Herelleviridae
"Fredfastierviridae" (proposed to group Jamesmcgillvirus)
"Kleczkowskaviridae"
Kyanoviridae
Madisaviridae
Mesyanzhinovviridae
Molycolviridae
Naomviridae
Orlajensenviridae
Pachyviridae
Peduoviridae
Pervagoviridae
"Pootjesviridae" (proposed to group Olivercinquevirus)
Rountreeviridae
Salasmaviridae
Saparoviridae
Schitoviridae
"Stanwillamsviridae"(proposed to group Karimacvirus, Samistivirus, Wilnyevirus, Gilsonvirus and Annadreamyvirus) 
Straboviridae
Suolaviridae
Vertoviridae
Vilmaviridae
Winoviridae
Zierdtviridae
Zobellviridae

Unassigned Subfamilies 
"Andregratiaviridae"
Andrewesvirinae
Arquatrovirinae
"Azeevirinae" (proposed to group Liebevirus, Yangvirus and Mannhattanvirus)
Azeredovirinae
Bclasvirinae
Beephvirinae
Boydwoodruffvirinae
Bronfenbrennervirinae
Ceeclamvirinae
Chebruvirinae
Dclasvirinae
Deejayvirinae
"Deeyouvirinae"
Dolichocephalovirinae
Eekayvirinae
Eucampyvirinae
Gclasvirinae
Gochnauervirinae
Gorgonvirinae
"Gorgonclarkvirinae" (proposed to group Kuravirus)
Gracegardnervirinae
Guernseyvirinae
Gutmannvirinae
Hendrixvirinae
"Iiscvirinae"
"Joanripponvirinae"
Kantovirinae
Langleyhallvirinae
Mccleskeyvirinae
Nclasvirinae
Nymbaxtervirinae
Ounavirinae
Pclasvirinae
Queuovirinae
Ruthgordonvirinae
Sepvirinae
"Sejongvirinae"
Skryabinvirinae
Stephanstirmvirinae
Trabyvirinae
Tybeckvirinae
Vequintavirinae
Weiservirinae

Unassigned Genera

Bacteriophage evolution 
Bacteriophages occur in over 1100 bacterial or archaeal genera. Over 6300 bacteriophages have been examined in the electron microscope since 1959. Of these, more than 96 percent have tails. Of the tailed phages, about 57 percent have long, noncontractile tails ("Siphoviridae"). Tailed phages appear to be monophyletic and are the oldest known virus group.

See also 
 WO virus

References

Further reading 

 
 

 
Archaeal viruses
Bacteriophages
Virus orders